True frogs is the common name for the frog family Ranidae. They have the widest distribution of any frog family. They are abundant throughout most of the world, occurring on all continents except Antarctica. The true frogs are present in North America, northern South America, Europe, Africa (including Madagascar), and Asia. The Asian range extends across the East Indies to New Guinea and a single species, the Australian wood frog (Hylarana daemelii), has spread into the far north of Australia.

Typically, true frogs are smooth and moist-skinned, with large, powerful legs and extensively webbed feet. The true frogs vary greatly in size, ranging from small—such as the wood frog (Lithobates sylvatica)—to large.

Many of the true frogs are aquatic or live close to water. Most species lay their eggs in the water and go through a tadpole stage. However, as in most families of frogs, there is large variation of habitat within the family. There are also arboreal species of true frogs, and the family includes some of the very few amphibians that can live in brackish water.

Evolution 
The Ranidae are related to several other frog families that have Eurasian and Indian origins, including Rhacophoridae, Dicroglossidae, Nyctibatrachidae, Micrixalidae, and Ranixalidae. They are thought to be most closely related to the Indian-endemic Nyctibatrachidae, from which they diverged in the early Eocene. However, other studies recover a closer relationship with the Dicroglossidae.

It was previously thought that the Ranidae and their closest relatives were of Gondwanan origins, having evolved on Insular India during the Cretaceous. They were then entirely restricted to the Indian subcontinent until the late Eocene, when India collided with Asia, allowing the Ranidae to colonize Eurasia and eventually the rest of the world. However, more recent studies instead propose that the Ranidae originated in Eurasia, and their close relationship with India-endemic frog lineages is due to those lineages colonizing India from Eurasia during the Paleogene.

Systematics
The subdivisions of the Ranidae are still a matter of dispute, although most are coming to an agreement. Several former subfamilies are now recognised as separate families (Petropedetidae, Cacosterninae, Mantellidae, and Dicroglossidae). The genus Rana has now been split up and is much reduced in size.

While too little of the vast diversity of true frogs has been subject to recent studies to say something definite, as of mid-2008, studies are going on, and several lineages are recognizable.
 The genus Staurois is probably a very ancient offshoot of the main Raninae lineage.
 Amolops has been generally delimited as a monophyletic group.
 Odorrana and Rana plus some proposed minor genera (which probably ought to be included in the latter) form another group.
 A group including Clinotarsus, Huia in the strict sense and Meristogenys
 An ill-defined assemblage of Babina, Glandirana, Hylarana, Pulchrana, Sanguirana, and Sylvirana, as well as Hydrophylax and Pelophylax, which are probably not monophyletic. Some authorities have treated them as junior synonyms of the genus Hylarana.
The following phylogeny of some genera was recovered by Che et al., 2007 using mitochondrial genes.

Genera

Most of the subfamilies formerly included under Ranidae are now treated as separate families, leaving only Raninae remaining. The following genera are recognised in the family Ranidae:

 Abavorana Oliver, Prendini, Kraus, and Raxworthy, 2015
 Amnirana Dubois, 1992
 Amolops Cope, 1865
 Babina Thompson, 1912
 Chalcorana Dubois, 1992
 Clinotarsus Mivart 1869
 Glandirana Fei, Ye, and Huang, 1990 
 Huia Yang, 1991
 Humerana Dubois, 1992
 Hydrophylax Fitzinger, 1843
 Hylarana Tschudi 1838 
 Indosylvirana Oliver, Prendini, Kraus, and Raxworthy, 2015
 Lithobates Fitzinger, 1843
 Meristogenys Yang, 1991
 Nidirana Dubois, 1992
 Odorrana Fei, Ye, and Huang, 1990 
 Papurana Dubois, 1992
 Pelophylax Fitzinger 1843 
 Pseudorana Fei, Ye, and Huang, 1990
 Pterorana Kiyasetuo and Khare, 1986
 Pulchrana Dubois, 1992
 Rana Linnaeus, 1758
 Sanguirana Dubois, 1992
 Staurois Cope, 1865
 Sumaterana Arifin, Smart, Hertwig, Smith, Iskandar, and Haas, 2018
 Sylvirana Dubois, 1992
 Wijayarana Arifin, Chan, Smart, Hertwig, Smith, Iskandar, and Haas, 2021

Incertae sedis
A number of taxa are placed in Ranidae incertae sedis, that is, their taxonomic status is too uncertain to allow more specific placement. 
 "Hylarana" chitwanensis (Das, 1998)
 "Hylarana" garoensis (Boulenger, 1920)
 "Hylarana" latouchii (Boulenger, 1899)
 "Hylarana" margariana Anderson, 1879
 "Hylarana" montivaga (Smith, 1921)
 "Hylarana" persimilis (Van Kampen, 1923)

See also
Halipegus eccentricus, a monoecious, digenea parasitic trematode commonly found in true frogs in North America

References

  (2004): Encyclopedia of Reptiles & Amphibians (2nd ed.). Fog City Press. 
  (2006): Amphibian Species of the World Version 3 - Petropedetidae Noble, 1931. American Museum of Natural History, New York, USA. Retrieved 2006-AUG-05.
  (2006): The amphibian tree of life. Bulletin of the American Museum of Natural History. Number 297. New York.
  (2007) Constraints in naming parts of the Tree of Life. Mol. Phylogenet. Evol. 42 (2): 331–338.  PDF fulltext 
  (2005): Phylogeny of the New World true frogs (Rana). Mol. Phylogenet. Evol. 34 (2): 299–314.  PDF fulltext 
  (2009): Taxonomic freedom and the role of official lists of species names. Herpetologica 65: 115-128.
 (2007): "Fine del prodromo d'erpetologia siciliana ". Specchio delle Scienze, o, Giornale Enciclopedico di Sicilia 2: 102-104. (Ranidae, new family). (in Italian).

Taxa named by Constantine Samuel Rafinesque